Monitor Charter Township is a charter township of Bay County in the U.S. state of Michigan, organized in 1869.  The township's population was 10,735 as of the 2010 census and is included in the Bay City Metropolitan Statistical Area.

Communities
There are two unincorporated communities within the Township:
Kawkawlin is located on M-13 on the south side of the Kawkawlin River just south of the border with Kawkawlin Township. (Elevation:  597/182 m.)
Brooks is located at the intersection of the Huron and Eastern Railway and Hotchkiss Road and Euclid Avenue where the borders of the Township, Frankenlust Township and Bay City meet.

History
The Kawkawlin Post Office opened on March 6, 1868 in Kawkawlin and has been in operation ever since.

On January 16, 1897, A post office, Colfax Post Office, opened in the township at Mackinaw Road and Salzburg Road. On May 15, 1900, the Colfax Post Office was closed down for the first time.  The Post Office name Colfax was reopened on May 29, 1900 and lasting until May 15, 1901.

Geography

Demographics
As of the census of 2000, there were 10,037 people, 3,975 households, and 2,949 families residing in the township. The racial makeup of the township was 97.83% White, 0.22% African American, 0.21% Native American, 0.37% Asian, 0.50% from other races, and 0.88% from two or more races. Hispanic or Latino of any race were 1.68% of the population.

There were 3,975 households, out of which 27.7% had children under the age of 18 living with them, 64.9% were married couples living together, 6.7% had a female householder with no husband present, and 25.8% were non-families. 22.9% of all households were made up of individuals, and 10.9% had someone living alone who was 65 years of age or older.  The average household size was 2.47 and the average family size was 2.91.

In the township the population was spread out, with 21.3% under the age of 18, 6.8% from 18 to 24, 24.5% from 25 to 44, 28.0% from 45 to 64, and 19.2% who were 65 years of age or older.  The median age was 43 years. For every 100 females, there were 91.4 males.  For every 100 females age 18 and over, there were 88.1 males.

The median income for a household in the township was $50,106, and the median income for a family was $56,812. Males had a median income of $46,844 versus $25,951 for females. The per capita income for the township was $23,644.  About 2.6% of families and 5.5% of the population were below the poverty line, including 4.1% of those under age 18 and 8.9% of those age 65 or over.

References

External links 
 Township Officials
 Monitor Township information, from Bay-Journal.com

Townships in Bay County, Michigan
Charter townships in Michigan
1869 establishments in Michigan
Populated places established in 1869